Cannery Row is a street in Monterey, California.

Cannery Row may also refer to:

 Cannery Row (novel), a 1945 novel by John Steinbeck
 Cannery Row (film), a 1982 film adapted from the novel
 "Cannery Row", a 2012 Judge John Hodgman podcast episode
 Cannery Row, Nashville, an area near downtown Nashville, Tennessee

See also
 Canary Row, a 1949 Merrie Melodies short